The Roman temple of Alcántara is located at one side of the Alcántara Bridge, Cáceres, Extremadura (Spain). Along with the Roman temple of Vic, it is one of the only two Roman temples preserved nearly complete in Spain.

History 
The bridge, triumphal arch and temple were all designed by the same architect, Gaius Julius Lacer, who dedicated the last to the deified emperors of Rome. He concluded his work in 103 AD. The origin of the architect appears to be local, but stylistically the features of the building appear closely related to contemporary buildings in the Italica province. This suggests that the architect either studied in what is today Italy, or was born there and later moved to the Lusitania province. The temple was constructed as an offering to Trajan and the gods of Rome. If still in use, the temple would have been closed during the persecution of pagans under the Christian emperors of the fourth century. After the conquest of Cáceres in 1169 by Ferdinand II of Leon, the temple was converted into a chapel of St. Julian; one reason the building remains so well-preserved. The conversion saw the addition of a belfry and a skull with tibias. The temple would eventually become a milestone along the pilgrimage route to Santiago de Compostela. The architect was buried in the temple; his tomb is still preserved inside.

Architecture 
Alcántara is a small votive temple in antis, rectangular, with a single camera or cell. The temple is constructed of granite. The entrance is flanked by two Tuscan columns and accessed by an exterior staircase, covered with a gabled roof made of slabs of stone, with a pediment with trim at the edges and a smooth tympanum without decoration. The bill is reminiscent of the Treasury of Athens at Delphi. The bridge and temple are built with granite blocks of equal size.

Inscriptions
Presented in the lintel of the temple are inscriptions (now are not original, but subsequent copies as the last makes clear) attesting to the dedication by the architect Gaius Julius Lacer to the Emperor Trajan.

CIL 02, 00761

English translation:

See also
 List of Ancient Roman temples

References 

 
2nd-century religious buildings and structures